S4, S 4, Š-4, S.4 or S-4 may refer to:

People
 S4 (Dota player), Gustav Magnusson, Swedish Dota 2 player
 S4 (military), a logistics officer within military units

Places
 County Route S4 (California), a road in San Diego, California

Science and mathematics

Mathematics
 S4 algebra, a variety of modal algebras, also called Interior algebra
 Symmetric group S4 (S4), an abstract mathematical group
 S4, a normal modal logic

Chemistry
 S4: Keep away from living quarters, a safety phrase in chemistry
 Tetrasulfur (S4), an allotrope of sulfur

Biology
 Fourth heart sound, or S4, an abnormal heart sound often indicative of congestive heart failure or cor pulmonale
 Fourth sacrum of the vertebral column in human anatomy
 Sacral spinal nerve 4, a spinal nerve of the sacral segment

Technology
 S (programming language) version 4
 Hibernation a sleeping state in a computer
 SG2 Shareable (Fire Control) Software Suite (S4)
 Nikon Coolpix S4, a camera
 Samsung Galaxy S4, a smartphone
 Samsung Galaxy S4 Mini, a mini version of the Samsung Galaxy S4
 Samsung Galaxy Tab S4, an Android tablet

Transportation

Routes
 S4 (Berlin), an S-Bahn line
 S4 (Munich), an S-Bahn line
 S4 (Nuremberg), an S-Bahn line
 S4 (Rhine-Main S-Bahn), an S-Bahn line
 S4 (Rhine-Ruhr S-Bahn), an S-Bahn line
 S4 (St. Gallen S-Bahn), an S-Bahn line in Switzerland
 S4 (RER Vaud), an S-Bahn line in Switzerland
 S4 (ZVV) line S4, a line of the S-Bahn Zürich in Switzerland
 Bremen S-Bahn line S4
 Hanover S-Bahn line S4
 Rhine-Neckar S-Bahn line S4
 Rostock S-Bahn line S4, a 2010-planned future line
 Stadtbahn Karlsruhe line S4
 Stuttgart S-Bahn line S4
 S4, a line of the Brussels Regional Express Network

Vehicles
 Alco S-4, a locomotive
 Audi S4, a car
 Lancia Delta S4, a 1984 Group B rally car
 Hydra Technologies Ehécatl, S4, a Mexican unmanned aerial vehicle
 Letov Š-4, a 1923 Czechoslovak aircraft
 Prussian S 4, an 1894 steam locomotives class
 Seibel S-4, a 1951 helicopter
 Supermarine S.4, a 1925 British seaplane
 USS S-4 (SS-109), a 1919 US Navy submarine

Groups, companies, organizations
 S04, FC Schalke 04, a German professional sports club
 Shift4 Payments, a U.S. payment processor
 SATA International (IATA airline designator "S4"), Azores Airlines

Other
 S4 (classification), a disability swimming classification
 Form S-4, a form required by the Securities and Exchange Commission to declare mergers and acquisitions
 S4 standard, a set of standards for model railways (P4 gauge)

See also

 
 SSSS (disambiguation)
 4S (disambiguation)
 S (disambiguation)
 4 (disambiguation)